The Wiesenburg Castle ( or ) is a castle located in the Wiesenburg district of Wildenfels, Germany, on a hill overlooking the eastern shore of the Mulde river. The castle protects the bridge across the Mulde to Schönau and Wildenfels.

Structure 
Today's castle arose out of a medieval castle, the construction of which probably began around the year 1200. The castle was first mentioned in a document dated 1251. The building was expanded in the 14th century.

The only remains of the original castle are a part of the round keep, remnants of the castle wall, and a moat. Today's courtyard, with its timber construction and the octagonal gate tower, were developed when the castle was reconstructed in 1664 after the Thirty Years' War.

History and owners 

The first owners were the Vogts of Weida, who monitored the settling of the Kirchberg, Saxony basin and the Mulde area south-east of Zwickau. The inhabitants of more than twenty villages in the area had to pay socage to the castle, for example, all villages in the Rödel valley. Later, the castle ownership changed many times:
 1350 the castle came into the possession of the House of Wettin
 1412–1591 the castle was owned by the von der Planitz family
 1523, i.e. before the German Peasants' War, the castle was sacked by the serfs. Two years later, the peasants revolted again. Based on the time-imposed fines, one can calculate that 283 farmers must have participated in the uprising. That would have been almost all farmers of the estate subject to socage.
 1591 the city of Zwickau purchased the castle and the dominion
 1618 the Elector of Saxony obtained them
 1663 castle and lordship of Wiesenburg plus the city of Kirchberg were sold to Philip Louis of Holstein-Sonderburg
 1724 the lordship was acquired by Augustus II the Strong, who turned it into am Amt
 1803 the great hall collapsed
 1864 the castle and dominion were separated, the castle was sold to the district poor law association
 1864–1911 the castle was in use as a poor house
 1911 the castle was bought back
 1945 the castle was publicly owned; many homes were created inside the structure. The farm buildings were used by the local Landwirtschaftliche Produktionsgenossenschaft (collectived farms, comparable to a Kolkhoz in the Soviet Union).
1990 the castle is privately owned again. It is not publicly accessible.

Legend 
Legends tell of a secret passage which connects the castle with a "robber's castle" in the Kiefericht (a grove on the other side of the Mulde Valley).

Footnotes 

Castles in Saxony
Buildings and structures in Zwickau (district)